The Soldato class (also known as the Soldati class)  was a class of destroyers of the Italian Regia Marina (Royal Navy) built by Ansaldo of Genoa prior to the First World War. Ten were built for the Regia Marina between 1905 and 1910, while an eleventh ship was built for China but purchased by Italy before completion. They served during the First World War, where one was lost, with the remaining ships sold for scrap in the 1920s and early 1930s.

Design

The ships were powered by two sets of triple expansion steam engines fed by three Thornycroft water-tube boilers and driving two propeller shafts. The ships were fitted with three funnels.

All 10 ships were laid down in 1905, with the first four ships of the Artigliere group completed in 1907, with the remaining ships delivered in 1910. In 1910, China placed an order for a single destroyer based on the Soldato class, to be named Ching Po or Tsing Po. This ship was to have a gun armament of two 76 mm and four 47 mm guns, and was designed to use mixed fuel, with one boiler being coal-fired and two being oil-fired. In 1912, the under-construction ship was acquired by Italy, and renamed Ascaro. The ship's armament was revised to conform with the rest of the class, but the ship retained its non-standard machinery.

Service
The Soldato class were the most modern destroyers in the Regia Marina when the Italo-Turkish War broke out. Soldato-class destroyers took place in both the Battle of Preveza, where Italian destroyers, including  and  sank three Turkish torpedo boats. and the Battle of Kunfuda Bay, where the protected cruiser , together with Artigliere and  sank seven gunboats.

One ship, Garibaldino, was lost following a collision on 16 July 1918. The remaining ships were reclassified as torpedo boats on 1 July 1921 and were gradually discarded through the 1920s and early 1930s, with the final ship,  stricken on 15 December 1932.

Ships
Artigliere group

Alpino group

Ascaro

Notes

Citations

References

External links
 Soldato-class destroyer Marina Militare website

 
Destroyer classes
Destroyers of the Regia Marina
World War I naval ships of Italy
Ships built by Gio. Ansaldo & C.